Dave Ramsay (born March 18, 1970 in Saint John, New Brunswick) is a Yellowknife businessman and politician.

Political career
Ramsay first ran for a seat in the Northwest Territories Legislative Assembly in the 1999 Northwest Territories general election in the electoral district of Range Lake. He was defeated by candidate Sandy Lee finishing a close second. He would run again in the 2003 Northwest Territories general election this time in the electoral district of Kam Lake. He defeated two other candidates with nearly 50% of the vote to win his first term in office.

Ramsay was reelected to a second term in the 2007 general election.  He won a third term in the  2011 election and was chosen for cabinet on the formation of the 17th Assembly, serving as Minister of Transport.

References

External links
Dave Ramsay Legislature biography

1970 births
Living people
Members of the Legislative Assembly of the Northwest Territories
Politicians from Saint John, New Brunswick
People from Yellowknife
Members of the Executive Council of the Northwest Territories
21st-century Canadian politicians